Segna di Bonaventura, also known as Segna de Bonaventura, and as Segna di Buonaventura, was an Italian painter of the Sienese School. He was active from about 1298 to 1331. In 1306 he painted a panel for the office of the Biccherna in the Palazzo Pubblico in Siena. In 1317 he painted an altar panel for the convent of Lecceto (near Siena). In 1319 he repaired a figure of the Virgin in the Palazzo Pubblico. In 1321 he painted a panel for the Palazzo Pubblico. Segna di Bonaventura’s sons Niccolò di Segna and Francesco di Segna di Bonaventura were also painters of the Sienese School

Like Duccio, Segna di Bonaventura’s paintings are characterized by graceful curvilinear rhythms and subtle blends of colors. The Alte Pinakothek (Munich), the Honolulu Museum of Art, the Metropolitan Museum of Art, the Minneapolis Institute of Arts, the North Carolina Museum of Art, and the Pinacoteca Nazionale di Siena are among the public collections having paintings by Segna di Bonaventura.

References
 Fredericksen, Burton and Federico Zeri, “Census of 14th-Century Italian Paintings in North American Public Collections”, Harvard University Press, Cambridge, 1972.

Gallery

External links
Italian Paintings: Sienese and Central Italian Schools, a collection catalog containing information about Bonaventura and his works (see index; plates 1-3).

13th-century Italian painters
Italian male painters
14th-century Italian painters
Trecento painters
Painters from Siena
Year of death unknown
Year of birth unknown
Gothic painters